Michelle Eileen McNamara (April 14, 1970 – April 21, 2016) was an American true crime author. She was the author of the true crime book I'll Be Gone in the Dark: One Woman's Obsessive Search for the Golden State Killer, and helped coin the moniker "Golden State Killer" of the serial killer who was identified after her death as Joseph James DeAngelo. The book was released posthumously in February 2018 and later adapted into the 2020 HBO documentary series I'll Be Gone in the Dark.

Early life
Michelle Eileen McNamara was born in Oak Park, Illinois, on April 14, 1970, the youngest child of stay-at-home mother Rita (née Rigney) and trial lawyer Thomas W. McNamara. She had four older sisters and one older brother. Her parents were Irish-Americans, and she was raised Catholic. In 1988, she graduated from Oak Park and River Forest High School, where she had been editor-in-chief of The Trapeze (the student newspaper) during her senior year. In 1992, she graduated from the University of Notre Dame with a BA in English. She earned an MFA in creative writing from the University of Minnesota. After graduating, she moved to Los Angeles in 1997 and aimed to become a writer in the film and TV industry.

Career 
In 2006, McNamara launched her website TrueCrimeDiary. McNamara had a long-standing fascination with true crime originating from the unsolved murder of Kathleen Lombardo that happened two blocks from where she lived when she was young. In 2014, McNamara and true crime investigative journalist Billy Jensen were on a SXSW Interactive panel called "Citizen Dicks: Solving Murders With Social Media". McNamara and Jensen had a long-term friendship based on their shared passion for researching and writing about true crime.

McNamara became interested in the crimes of the unidentified rapist and murderer known as the East Area Rapist, Original Night Stalker and the Visalia Ransacker, among other epithets. Due in large part to McNamara's efforts in tying these crime clusters together in public consciousness after the EAR and ONS crimes were linked by DNA, the murderer was later to be known only as the Golden State Killer (GSK). She penned articles for Los Angeles magazine about the serial killer in 2013 and 2014. Paul Holes, an investigator for the Contra Costa County district attorney's office stated that McNamara's dogged persistence and trustworthiness with sensitive information about GSK cases earned her an unusual level of cooperation from law enforcement officials. She then signed a book deal with HarperCollins and began to work on a book about the case.

Her book, I'll Be Gone in the Dark: One Woman's Obsessive Search for the Golden State Killer, was about two-thirds finished at her death. The document was edited and completed by true crime writers Paul Haynes, Billy Jensen and her widower Patton Oswalt following her death. The book, released posthumously on February 27, 2018 (almost two years after her death), reached number 2 of The New York Times Best Seller list for non-fiction and number 1 of combined print and e-book, nonfiction. The book remained on the list for 15 weeks.

On April 9, 2018, HBO announced that it had purchased the rights for her book and was developing it into a documentary series called I'll Be Gone in the Dark. Filming for the series began on April 24, 2018. The documentary series, also titled I'll Be Gone in the Dark, is directed by Liz Garbus and premiered on June 28, 2020.

On the evening of April 24, 2018, authorities in California identified Joseph James DeAngelo as the Golden State Killer and arrested him at his home. Oswalt stated that authorities' use of the killer's nickname that McNamara coined was "proof of the impact of her work".

Personal life
McNamara married comedian Patton Oswalt on September 24, 2005. They had a daughter named Alice (born April 15, 2009).

Death
McNamara died in her sleep at her family's Los Angeles home on April 21, 2016, at the age of 46. According to the autopsy report released online by Radar, her death was due to the effects of multiple prescription drugs including Adderall, fentanyl, and Xanax. The musician Prince, who died on the same day as McNamara, also had his death attributed to an accidental fentanyl overdose. According to the Radar article, several of the medications were not prescribed to her, and other drugs such as cocaine and levamisole were also found in her possession. Previously undiagnosed heart disease was a contributing factor, and the coroner ruled her death an accidental overdose. In June 2020, her widower Patton Oswalt and I'll be Gone in the Dark director Liz Garbus acknowledged that McNamara had been addicted to opioids.

McNamara is interred at Forest Lawn Memorial Park in Los Angeles.

Selected works

References

External links

 
 Michelle McNamara at Los Angeles Magazine
 
 

21st-century American women writers
1970 births
2016 deaths
Accidental deaths in California
American crime writers
American people of Irish descent
American women bloggers
American bloggers
Anthony Award winners
Burials at Forest Lawn Memorial Park (Hollywood Hills)
Drug-related deaths in California
Place of birth missing
University of Minnesota alumni
University of Notre Dame alumni
Women crime writers
Writers from Oak Park, Illinois